Margaret Ann Critchley (born 4 April 1949) is a retired British international sprinter.

Athletics career
She competed in the women's 200 metres at the 1972 Summer Olympics.

She represented England and won a silver medal in the 4 x 100 metres relay and a bronze medal in the 200 metres, at the 1970 British Commonwealth Games in Edinburgh, Scotland.

References

1949 births
Living people
Athletes (track and field) at the 1972 Summer Olympics
British female sprinters
Olympic athletes of Great Britain
Athletes (track and field) at the 1970 British Commonwealth Games
Commonwealth Games medallists in athletics
Commonwealth Games silver medallists for England
Commonwealth Games bronze medallists for England
Sportspeople from Bristol
Olympic female sprinters
Medallists at the 1970 British Commonwealth Games